The 2022–23 Austin Peay Governors men's basketball team represented Austin Peay State University in the 2022–23 NCAA Division I men's basketball season. The Governors, led by second-year head coach Nate James, played their home games at the Dunn Center in Clarksville, Tennessee as first-year members of the ASUN Conference. They finished the season 9–22, 3–15 in ASUN play to finish in last place. They failed to qualify for the ASUN tournament.

Previous season
The Governors finished the 2021–22 season 12–17, 8–10 in OVC play to finish in a tie for fifth place. As the No. 6 seed in the OVC tournament, they lost to Tennessee Tech in the first round. 

The season marked their last season as members of the Ohio Valley Conference, where they had been members since 1962. They joined the ASUN Conference on July 1, 2022. 

This was also meant to be their last season in the Dunn Center, but the opening of their future home, F&M Bank Arena, was delayed until July 2023.

Roster

Schedule and results

|-
!colspan=12 style=| Exhibition

|-
!colspan=12 style=| Non-conference regular season

|-
!colspan=12 style=| ASUN regular season

Sources

References

Austin Peay Governors men's basketball seasons
Austin Peay Governors
Austin Peay Governors basketball
Austin Peay Governors basketball